The H. Russell Albee House is a dwelling in southeast Portland in the U.S. state of Oregon that is listed on the National Register of Historic Places.  A Colonial Revival structure built in 1912 for future Portland mayor H. Russell Albee, it was added to the register in 1992.

See also
 National Register of Historic Places listings in Southeast Portland, Oregon

References

External links
 

1912 establishments in Oregon
A. E. Doyle buildings
Colonial Revival architecture in Oregon
Houses completed in 1912
Houses on the National Register of Historic Places in Portland, Oregon
Laurelhurst, Portland, Oregon
Portland Historic Landmarks
Southeast Portland, Oregon